Kim Hye-eun (born March 1, 1973) is a South Korean actress. Kim began working as an announcer for the MBC network in 1997, first at a local affiliate in Cheongju, then later as a weathercaster of the main news desk in Seoul. After eight years, she resigned from MBC in 2004. Kim pursued acting in earnest in 2007, and has since starred in films and television series, notably Nameless Gangster: Rules of the Time (2012) and Secret Love Affair (2014).

Personal life 
Kim is the cousin of writer Min-jin Lee, who wrote the book Pachinko.

Filmography

Television series

Web series

Film

Variety show

Awards and nominations

References

External links 
 
 
 

1973 births
Living people
South Korean television actresses
South Korean film actresses
Seoul National University alumni
20th-century South Korean actresses
21st-century South Korean actresses
Gim clan of Gyeongju
People from Busan